Julus (alternately written as Iulus) is a genus of millipedes in the family Julidae, containing the following species:

References

Julida
Millipede genera
Taxa named by Carl Linnaeus